Kiss of the Vampire may refer to:

Kiss of the Vampire (film), a 1963 film by Don Sharp
Kiss of the Vampire, also titled Immortally Yours, a 2009 film by Joe Tornatore
Kiss of the Vampire, a novel by Francine Pascal

See also
Vampire's Kiss, a 1989 film with Nicolas Cage
Vampire Kisses (series), a series of books written by Ellen Schreiber
Vampire Kisses (novel), the first book of Ellen Schreiber's series
O Beijo do Vampiro, a Brazilian telenovela (titled "The Kiss of the Vampire" in Portuguese)
I Kissed a Vampire, a vampire rock musical web series
Castlevania: Dracula X, a 1995 videogame by Konami released as "Castlevania: Dracula's Kiss" in Europe